Coatlen Othell Wilson (born October 26, 1961) is an American former professional basketball player. 

A 6'0" (183 cm) 190 lb (86 kg) point guard, Othell Wilson attended Woodbridge High School and Gar-Field Senior High School, both in Virginia.

He played collegiately at the University of Virginia from 1980 to 1984. At UVa, he scored 1469 points, handed out 493 assists, and was credited with 222 assists in his 127 collegiate games. He was named to two All ACC teams and played in two Final Fours. 

Wilson was selected by the Golden State Warriors with the 11th pick in the 2nd round of the 1984 NBA Draft. 

During his rookie season with the Warriors, he averaged 4.4 points, 1.8 rebounds and 2.9 assists in 74 games. After not playing for any NBA team during the following season, he played 53 games with the Sacramento Kings in 1986-87. 

Wilson was hired as head coach at St. Mary's College, Maryland in 2000. Soon afterward, he faced an accusation that he kidnapped and raped his former girlfriend in September 1999. Acquitted of that charge, his contract was not renewed after one season.  His coaching contract was not renewed the following July.

Notes

External links
NBA stats @ basketballreference.com

1961 births
Living people
African-American basketball coaches
African-American basketball players
American men's basketball players
Basketball players from Virginia
Golden State Warriors draft picks
Golden State Warriors players
People acquitted of kidnapping
People acquitted of rape
Point guards
Sacramento Kings players
Savannah Spirits players
Sportspeople from Alexandria, Virginia
St. Mary's College of Maryland
Topeka Sizzlers players
Virginia Cavaliers men's basketball players
21st-century African-American people
20th-century African-American sportspeople